The Lockley-Newport LN-23, also called the Gloucester 23, is an American trailerable sailboat that was designed by Stuart Windley and Harry R. Sindle as a racer-cruiser and first built in 1978.

Production
The design was built by Lockley-Newport Boats in the United States, starting in 1978. It was developed into the Gloucester 22 in 1983 and produced until the company went out of business in 1988. The molds were then acquired by Classic Yachts of Chanute, Kansas and the boat became the Classic 22 (Windley) in 1990 and was built until 2000.

Design
The Lockley-Newport LN-23 is a recreational keelboat, built predominantly of fiberglass, with wood trim. It has a fractional sloop rig, a raked stem, a plumb transom, a transom-hung rudder controlled by a tiller and a fixed stub keel with a retractable centerboard. It displaces  and carries  of lead ballast.

The boat is normally fitted with a small  outboard motor for docking and maneuvering.

The design has sleeping accommodation for four people, with a double "V"-berth in the bow cabin and two straight settee berths in the main cabin, one of which is an optional double. The head is located just aft of the bow cabin on the port side.

Operational history
In a 2010 review Steve Henkel wrote, "like her sisters, the Gloucester 16 ... and the Gloucester 19 ... her molds were passed from one business entity to another, and construction was perhaps understandably what one might call 'variable.' Best features: There isn't much to get excited about with this boat, in our opinion. True, it's a matter of taste, but we feel that she is a plain Jane in a crowded field with many more attractive boats vying for attention ... Sorry, but we can't conjure up any significant 'best features' for her. Worst features: Her so-so construction and a lack of amenities below top the list of things we feel work against her."

See also
List of sailing boat types

Related development
Gloucester 22

References

External links
Photo of a Lockley-Newport LN-23

Keelboats
1970s sailboat type designs
Sailing yachts
Trailer sailers
Sailboat type designs by Stuart Windley
Sailboat type designs by Harry R. Sindle
Sailboat types built by Lockley Newport Boats